John Armitage (1812–1893) was a Scottish-American textile manufacturer and politician.

Personal life
Armitage was born on August 20, 1812, in Jedburgh. In 1838 he married Nancy Goodhue. They had 10 children, 7 of whom survived into adulthood. In 1865 the Armitages had a large estate constructed on five acres of land on Summer Street in Saugus.

Business career
Armitage worked in the woolen business for many years as a laborer, spinner, and weaver before becoming a partner in Edward Pranker & Co. in 1857. In 1860, the company built a two-story, 125 by 60 foot, mill opposite their existing mill that contained four sets of wool manufacturing equipment. Armitage remained with the company until Pranker's death in 1865. He was also a director of the Saugus Mutual Fire Insurance Company.

Politics
Armitage held various political offices in Saugus. In 1870 he represented the 20th Essex District, which comprised the towns of Saugus, Lynnfield, Middleton, and Topsfield.

References

1812 births
1893 deaths
19th-century American businesspeople
American textile industry businesspeople
Members of the Massachusetts House of Representatives
People from Saugus, Massachusetts
Scottish emigrants to the United States